Smith Peak is a prominent peak of the Walker Mountains on Thurston Island, Antarctica. It was first delineated from air photos taken by U.S. Navy Operation Highjump in December 1946 and named by the Advisory Committee on Antarctic Names (US-ACAN) for Dean C. Smith, aviation pilot of the Byrd Antarctic Expedition (ByrdAE) in 1928–30.

References 

Mountains of Ellsworth Land